Claus-Peter Schnorr (born 4 August 1943) is a German mathematician and cryptographer.

Life 
He received his Ph.D. from the University of Saarbrücken in 1966, and his habilitation in 1970. Schnorr's contributions to cryptography include his study of Schnorr groups, which are used in the digital signature algorithm bearing his name. Besides this, Schnorr is known for his contributions to algorithmic information theory and for creating an approach to the definition of an algorithmically random sequence which is alternative to the concept of Martin-Löf randomness.

Schnorr was a professor of mathematics and computer science at the Johann Wolfgang Goethe University at Frankfurt. He retired in 2011 after working there for 40 years. He is also a Distinguished Associate of RSA Laboratories, and a joint recipient of the Gottfried Wilhelm Leibniz Prize together with Johannes Buchmann in 1993. He received, with Jean-Jacques Quisquater, the RSA Award for Excellence in Mathematics in 2013.

Schnorr held a patent on Schnorr signatures until 2008.

References
 Archived version of Schnorr's home page

External links
 Schnorr's patent and its relation to DSA

20th-century German mathematicians
Modern cryptographers
Living people
1943 births
International Association for Cryptologic Research fellows
21st-century German mathematicians
German cryptographers